Jemiołów  (formerly German Petersdorf) is a village in the administrative district of Gmina Łagów, within Świebodzin County, Lubusz Voivodeship, in western Poland.

On 1 September 2001 Jemiołów and Banzendorf concluded a partnership between the two villages, signed by their mayors Stanisław Mucha and Peter Wilbers in Banzendorf.

References

Villages in Świebodzin County